Llansamlet is the name of an electoral ward (coterminous with the Llansamlet community) in the City and County of Swansea, Wales, UK.

The electoral ward consists of some or all of the following geographical areas: Birchgrove, Glais, Heol Las, Llansamlet, Morriston, Peniel Green, Pentre-Dwr, Talycopa, Trallwn and Summer Hill in the parliamentary constituency of Swansea East.  The Llansamlet ward is bounded by the wards of Clydach to the north, Morriston to the west, Neath Port Talbot county borough to the east, and Bonymaen to the south.

Local elections
Llansamlet councillor and Lord Mayor of Swansea, Dennis James, died in April 2013 after being diagnosed with cancer six months beforehand. His death led to a by-election:

In the 2012 local elections, the turnout was 30.32%.  The results were:

Districts
The suburb of Llansamlet is the area where part of the Swansea Enterprise Park is located.

Trallwn is a suburb to the east of the ward comprising a large housing estate and a local primary school, Trallwn Primary School.  Just to the south of Trallwn is Pentre Dwr, a predominantly farming and rural area.  There are a number of horse riding schools here. To the west of Pentre Dwr and Talycopa (behind Trallwn shops) is a small housing district Summer Hill. Although Trallwn, Talycopa and Summer Hill are not part of the Llansamlet area.

References

External links
Llansamlet history

Swansea electoral wards